Cristóbal Colón de Carvajal y Gorosábel, 18th Duke of Veragua, 17th Duke of la Vega, 19th Marquess of Aguilafuente, 16th Marquess of Jamaica, 20th Admiral of the Ocean Sea, GE, OIC (born October 4, 1949) is a Spanish nobleman, businessman and formerly an officer, helicopter pilot, and commander of a naval vessel in the Spanish Navy. He is a direct descendant of Christopher Columbus by way of Christopher's son, Diego. From Diego, Colón de Carvajal also holds the Duchy of Veragua since 1986. As the Duchy corresponds to the present-day Veraguas Province of the independent republic of Panama, Colón de Carvajal maintains close connections with Panamanian society, and serves on the advisory board of Petaquilla Minerals, a mining company.

In 1986, Colón inherited from his father the 17th Duke of Veragua all of his titles after he was murdered by the Basque nationalist and separatist organization ETA.

In 2011, his additional title as Duke of Vega was among many to be passed on to different successors, with the new Duke of Vega being Colón's son, Ángel Santiago Colón de Mandalúniz.

In 1992, to commemorate the 500th anniversary of Columbus' landing on Hispaniola, Colón de Carvajal was co-designated Grand Marshal of the Tournament of Roses Parade, alongside US Congressman Ben Nighthorse Campbell.

References

Cristobal
Dukes of Spain
Helicopter pilots
20th-century Spanish people
1949 births
Living people
Spanish businesspeople
Spanish naval officers